Al-Hadith (The Modern) was a literary magazine published in Aleppo.

Early sections of the publication included women's issues, literature, and arts and sciences.

References

Literary magazines
Magazines established in 1927
Magazines with year of disestablishment missing
Arabic-language magazines
Defunct magazines published in Syria
Defunct literary magazines